Pedra Bela is a municipality in the state of São Paulo in Brazil. The population is 6,110 (2020 est.) in an area of 159 km². The elevation is 1,120 m.

References

Municipalities in São Paulo (state)